Giannis Karalis (born 6 November 1988) is a Greek professional footballer who plays as a forward.

External links
Profile at epae.org
Guardian Football
Profile at Onsports.gr

1988 births
Living people
Super League Greece players
Atromitos F.C. players
A.O. Kerkyra players
AEK Athens F.C. players
Kallithea F.C. players
Ergotelis F.C. players
PAS Lamia 1964 players
Ionikos F.C. players
Association football forwards
Footballers from Athens
Greek footballers